Calai is a town and municipality in Cuando Cubango Province in Angola.

The municipality has an area of 7,900 km and a population of 22,654 (2014). It is bordered to the north by the municipality of Nancova, to the east by the municipalities of Mavinga and Dirico, to the south by the Republic of Namibia, and to the west by the municipality of Cuangar. The municipality is constituted by the communes of Calai, Maué and Mavengue.

References

Populated places in Cuando Cubango Province
Municipalities of Angola